Guerdon W. Whiteley (October 5, 1859 – November 23, 1925) was a Major League Baseball outfielder who played for two seasons. He played for the Cleveland Blues in eight games during the 1884 Cleveland Blues season and for the Boston Beaneaters for 33 games during the 1885 Boston Beaneaters season. He continued to play in the minor league until 1892.

External links

Cleveland Blues (NL) players
Boston Beaneaters players
1859 births
1925 deaths
Baseball players from Rhode Island
Major League Baseball outfielders
19th-century baseball players
Newburyport Clamdiggers players
Biddeford (minor league baseball) players
Lynn (minor league baseball) players
Sioux City Corn Huskers players
Hutchinson (minor league baseball) players
Des Moines Hawkeyes players
Davenport Onion Weeders players
Des Moines Prohibitionists players
St. Joseph Clay Eaters players
Seattle (minor league baseball) players
Pendleton Ho Hos players
Phillipsburg Burgers players